Phlycticeratinae is an ammonite subfamily included in the Oppeliidae established for the genus Phlycticeras.  Although there seems  to be some affinity with Stephanoceratoidea it is most likely descended from some bathonian member of the Oppeliinae.

The genus Phlycticeras is involute,   feebly but coarsely ribbed, tuberculate, strongly strigate, with serrated keel and moderately complex sutures.

References
W.J. Arkell et al., 1957.  Mesozoic Ammonoidea. Treatise on Invertebrate Paleontology, Part L. Geological Society of America and University of Kansas Press.

Oppeliidae
Callovian first appearances
Middle Jurassic extinctions
Callovian life